Jean-Denis is a masculine given name, and may refer to:

 Jean-Denis Bredin (born 1929), a French attorney
 Jean-Denis Délétraz (born 1963), a Swiss racecar driver
 Jean-Denis Lanjuinais (1753–1827), a French politician, historian and nobleman
 Jean-Denis Lejeune (born 1959), a Belgian protester

See also

 Jean Denis (politician) (1902–1992), a Belgian politician and writer

Compound given names
French masculine given names